The 1944 Maxwell Field Marauders football team represented Maxwell Field during the 1944 college football season. Under head coach Jesse Yarborough, the Marauders compiled a 4–5 record.

Schedule

References

Maxwell Field
Maxwell Field Marauders football seasons
Maxwell Field Marauders football